Giuseppe Martano (Savona, 10 October 1910 — Turin, 2 September 1994) was an Italian professional road bicycle racer. Martano was twice world amateur champion. He reached the podium of the Tour de France twice, in 1933 (3rd place) and 1934 (2nd place), and in the Giro d'Italia once (1935).

Major results

1929 
1st Coppa Citta di Cuorgnè

1930 
1st  UCI Road World Championships (Amateurs)

1931 
1st G.P. Giglio a Roma

1932 
1st  UCI Road World Championships (Amateurs)
National Road Championships
1st  Road Race (Amateurs)
1st  Road Race (Independents)
1st Overall Giro del Piemonte
1st Stage 1
3rd Milano–Torino

1933 
3rd Overall Tour de France

1934 
2nd Overall Tour de France
1st Stage 8
2nd Giro della Toscana
2nd Giro del Piemonte

1935 
1st Overall Giro del Lazio
1st Stage 2
2nd Overall Giro d'Italia
2nd Giro della Toscana
3rd Giro di Campania
3rd Giro della Provincia Milano
10th Milan–San Remo

1937 
1st Milano–Torino
1st GP de Cannes
1st Stages 3 & 4b Paris–Nice

1939
3rd Overall Lyon–Grenoble–Lyon

External links 

Official Tour de France results for Giuseppe Martano

Italian male cyclists
1910 births
1994 deaths
Italian Tour de France stage winners
People from Savona
Cyclists from Liguria
Sportspeople from the Province of Savona